The 2021–22 Northern Colorado Bears men's basketball team represented the University of Northern Colorado in the 2021–22 NCAA Division I men's basketball season. The Bears, led by second-year head coach Steve Smiley, played their home games at Bank of Colorado Arena in Greeley, Colorado as members of the Big Sky Conference.

Previous season
The Bears finished the 2020–21 season 11–11, 6–8 in Big Sky play to finish in a tie for seventh place. As the #8 seed in the Big Sky tournament, they defeated #9 seed Sacramento State in the first round, before falling to top seeded Southern Utah in the quarterfinals.

Roster

Schedule and results

|-
!colspan=12 style=| Regular season

|-
!colspan=9 style=| Big Sky tournament

|-
!colspan=9 style=| College Basketball Invitational

Source

References

Northern Colorado Bears men's basketball seasons
Northern Colorado Bears
Northern Colorado Bears men's basketball
Northern Colorado Bears men's basketball
Northern Colorado